Aqueduct Bridge, also known as the Coffey Bridge and Clay County Bridge # 182, is a historic Pratt through truss and Pratt pony truss bridge located in Perry Township and Sugar Ridge Township, Clay County, Indiana. The original span was built by the Cleveland Bridge and Iron Company in 1880 and the second section by the Vincennes Bridge Company in 1920.  It carries Towpath Road over Birch Creek. The original span measures 60 feet long and the second span 102 feet long.  They rest on concrete abutments and a central pier.

It was added to the National Register of Historic Places in 2000.

References

Truss bridges in the United States
Road bridges on the National Register of Historic Places in Indiana
Bridges completed in 1880
Transportation buildings and structures in Clay County, Indiana
National Register of Historic Places in Clay County, Indiana